Cochylimorpha hedemanniana is a species of moth of the family Tortricidae. It is found in China (Anhui, Beijing, Hebei, Heilongjiang, Henan, Hubei, Jiangsu, Liaoning, Ningxia, Shaanxi, Shandong, Shanxi
Tianjin, Yunnan), Japan, Korea and Russia (southern Urals, Amur, Minussinsk, Jakowlewka, Blagowjestschensk, Winogradowka).

The wingspan is 13–19 mm. Adults have been recorded on the wing between May and August.

References

Moths described in 1883
Cochylimorpha
Moths of Asia